Ranier is a city in Koochiching County, Minnesota, United States. The population was 569 at the 2020 census.

Ranier is located east of the city of International Falls, along State Highway 11 (MN 11). Fort Frances, Ontario is located directly across the river.

Geography

The Rainy River and Rainy Lake meet at Ranier.

Demographics

2010 census
As of the census of 2010, there were 145 people, 70 households, and 40 families living in the city. The racial makeup of the city was 98.6% White, 0.7% Asian, and 0.7% from two or more races. Hispanic or Latino of any race were 1.4% of the population.

There were 70 households, of which 14.3% had children under the age of 18 living with them, 45.7% were married couples living together, 4.3% had a female householder with no husband present, 7.1% had a male householder with no wife present, and 42.9% were non-families. 38.6% of all households were made up of individuals, and 10% had someone living alone who was 65 years of age or older. The average household size was 1.83 and the average family size was 2.38.

The median age in the city was 56.8 years. 10.3% of residents were under the age of 18; 3.4% were between the ages of 18 and 24; 14.4% were from 25 to 44; 42.1% were from 45 to 64; and 29.7% were 65 years of age or older. The gender makeup of the city was 48.3% male and 51.7% female.

2000 census
As of the census of 2000, there were 188 people, 76 households, and 50 families living in the city. The racial makeup of the city was 97.87% White, 1.06% Native American, and 1.06% from two or more races.

There were 76 households, out of which 28.9% had children under the age of 18 living with them, 50.0% were married couples living together, 3.9% had a female householder with no husband present, and 32.9% were non-families. 27.6% of all households were made up of individuals, and 11.8% had someone living alone who was 65 years of age or older.  The average household size was 2.30 and the average family size was 2.78.

In the city, the population was spread out, with 22.3% under the age of 18, 3.7% from 18 to 24, 26.1% from 25 to 44, 26.1% from 45 to 64, and 21.8% who were 65 years of age or older.  The median age was 43 years. For every 100 females, there were 100.0 males.  For every 100 females age 18 and over, there were 100.0 males.

The median income for a household in the city was $39,375, and the median income for a family was $49,375. Males had a median income of $50,875 versus $25,833 for females. The per capita income for the city was $20,784.  None of the population or families were below the poverty line.

References
9.  

Cities in Koochiching County, Minnesota
Cities in Minnesota